Luiz Renato Viana da Silva (born January 10, 1982) is a former Brazilian football player.

Club statistics

References

External links

Kawasaki Frontale

1982 births
Living people
Brazilian footballers
Brazilian expatriate footballers
Expatriate footballers in Japan
J1 League players
J2 League players
Kawasaki Frontale players
Association football forwards